Delaware's 12th Senate district is one of 21 districts in the Delaware Senate. It has been represented by Democrat Nicole Poore, the Senate Majority Leader, since 2012.

Geography
District 12 covers much of central New Castle County along the Delaware River, including Delaware City, Wrangle Hill, Williamsburg, Kirkwood, Greylag, Bayview Manor, Monterey Farms, and parts of Glasgow, Bear, New Castle, and Wilmington Manor.

Like all districts in the state, the 12th Senate district is located entirely within Delaware's at-large congressional district. It overlaps with the 9th, 15th, 16th, 17th, and 27th districts of the Delaware House of Representatives.

Recent election results
Delaware Senators are elected to staggered four-year terms. Under normal circumstances, the 12th district holds elections in presidential years, except immediately after redistricting, when all seats are up for election regardless of usual cycle.

2020

2016

2012

Federal and statewide results in District 12

References 

12
New Castle County, Delaware